Elke Heinrichs (born 30 August 1964) is a German diver. She competed at the 1984 Summer Olympics and the 1988 Summer Olympics.

References

1964 births
Living people
German female divers
Olympic divers of West Germany
Divers at the 1984 Summer Olympics
Divers at the 1988 Summer Olympics
Sportspeople from Aachen
20th-century German women
21st-century German women